The 2009–10 Danish 1st Division season was the 14th season of the Danish 1st Division league championship, governed by the Danish Football Association.

The division-champion, AC Horsens, and runners-up, Lyngby BK, were promoted to the 2010–11 Danish Superliga. The teams in the 14th, 15th and 16th places, Thisted FC, BK Frem and Brabrand IF, were relegated to either 2nd Division East or West, based on their respective locations.

Participants

League table

Managerial changes

See also
2009-10 in Danish football

References

External links
  Danish FA

Danish 1st Division seasons
Denmark
2009–10 in Danish football